Manual may refer to:

Instructions
 User guide 
 Owner's manual
 Instruction manual (gaming)
 Online help

Other uses
 Manual (music), a keyboard, as for an organ
 Manual (band)
 Manual transmission
 Manual, a bicycle technique similar to a wheelie, but without the use of pedal torque
 Manual, balancing on two wheels in freestyle skateboarding tricks
 The Manual (How to Have a Number One the Easy Way) is a 1988 book by Bill Drummond and Jimmy Cauty

See also
 Instructions (disambiguation)
 Tutorial